KEZB is a radio station airing a Christian format licensed to Beaver, Utah, broadcasting on 90.7 MHz FM.  The station is owned by First Baptist Church.

References

External links

EZB